Bus routes in Perth, Western Australia are operated under the brand Transperth. The Public Transport Authority of the Government of Western Australia tenders the provision of bus routes in Perth to private operators; privatisation of services began in 1996. The privatisation of Transperth bus services was completed in July 1998. Path Transit, Swan Transit and Transdev WA currently operate services. Captain Cook Cruises similarly operates Transperth ferry services. The Public Transport Authority continues to operate Perth's urban rail system, under the division Transperth Trains.

Bus operations 
, all routes operated under Transperth are serviced by accessible buses. Typical Perth bus routes operate every 10–20 minutes in peak times, and every 30–60 minutes off peak on weekdays. Services generally finish before midnight, though many routes finish earlier, between 6:00 pm and 11:00 pm. Weekend services are approximately half weekday levels. Major routes are more frequent, operating every 10–15 minutes off peak on weekdays, and every 15–30 minutes on weekends and evenings.

Most bus routes terminate in Perth, at Elizabeth Quay, Perth Busport, in East Perth, and at suburban bus stations or railway stations. Some services in older areas terminate by looping on suburban streets.

Zero fare routes 

CAT routes are zero fare, circular services which operate in the central business districts of Perth and major regional centres Fremantle and Joondalup. They operate every 5–15 minutes on weekdays, and every 15 minutes on weekends except for Joondalup CAT routes. Similar circular services also operate in the Midland and Rockingham central business districts, although the Rockingham service charges a fare.

CircleRoute 

The CircleRoute is a circular service which operates in inner suburbs of Perth. Numbered 998 clockwise and 999 anticlockwise, it connects major hospitals, universities, schools, shopping centres, and all urban rail lines.

High frequency routes 
Some routes numbered in the 900s are high frequency routes. High frequency bus services operate at minimum every 15 minutes between 7am and 7pm on weekdays, 8am and 7pm on Saturdays, and 9am and 7pm on Sundays. Since 2014, several high frequency routes have been introduced, and other routes have been renumbered to the 900s to indicate high frequency. 

Route 950 operates between Morley, Elizabeth Quay, University of Western Australia and Queen Elizabeth II Medical Centre. It is the highest frequency bus route in Perth, operating up to every minute in peak times, every 7–8 minutes off peak on weekdays, and up to every 10 minutes on weekends. When introducing the route, the Public Transport Authority marketed it as the Superbus.

Route 960 operates between Mirrabooka, Edith Cowan University, Mount Lawley, Perth Busport, Victoria Park Bus Transfer station, and Curtin University. It is the second-highest frequency bus route in Perth, operating up to 5–10 minutes in peak times, every 10–20 minutes off peak on weekdays, and every 15–30 minutes on weekends. The route was intended to replicate the success of Route 950.

Timetables 
Timetables were, between 1999 and 2016, colour coded to indicate which area of the Perth metropolitan area they serve: green for the northern area, red for the eastern area, yellow for the south eastern area, orange for the southern area, and blue for the western area. Timetables for CAT services are silver, and timetables for high frequency services are aqua.

Currently, they are coded based on the type of service they run: normal services are white with green details, high frequency services are aqua with white details, and CAT services are silver with black details.

Perth bus route numbers 
Since 2002, routes have been divided into five main geographic areas: Northern, Western, Southern, South Eastern and Eastern. Routes are generally numbered based on the area they service, and the private bus operators have contracts based on service areas. As of 2020, the Morley and Kalamunda areas are contracted to Path Transit; Fremantle/Cockburn, and Rockingham/Mandurah areas, as well as the Perth CATs, are run by Transdev WA; and the remaining areas of Marmion, Beenyup, Joondalup, Canning, Claremont, Midland, and Southern River are operated by Swan Transit.

Bus routes by route number

Variations

Special services 
Transperth operates bus routes servicing special events such as sport matches and concerts. These may include regular bus services, which may operate with larger capacity buses or with additional trips, or special routes for the events. For example, nib Stadium is serviced by regular Beaufort Street and Lord Street routes, while Subiaco Oval had special events routes (now no longer running, due to the closure of the oval). Ten special events routes have been introduced to service the new Perth Stadium. Special event service routes are numbered in the 600s.

Crown Perth operates a "Crown Bus" service from various metropolitan destinations to the Burswood casino complex. Most routes depart from or pass through bus stations, with a morning trip to the casino and a return trip in the afternoon. These routes are also numbered in the 600s, and appear on Transperth station maps and bus stands.

Various "School Special" services are numbered in the 700s. Other school services operate as variations of standard Transperth services.

Train and ferry replacement bus services are numbered in the 900s, and operate when those services are interrupted. When only part of a train line is closed, the replacement buses will operate between the nearest open stations. As of October 2016, buses replacing Perth Station services depart from Perth Busport; previously, they departed from Roe Street bus station. Private operators such as Buswest may be used if there are insufficient Transperth-branded buses available, such as when unscheduled disruptions occur during peak periods.

Renumbered and withdrawn bus routes 
The following bus routes underwent route renumbering or service withdrawal since 2014:

See also 
 List of Transperth bus stations
 Transportation in Australia

References 

Bus routes

Perth
Bus transport in Western Australia